Waltham Abbey is a civil parish in Epping Forest District in Essex, England. Waltham Abbey is a recent renaming of the ancient parish of Waltham Holy Cross. Aside from the town of Waltham Abbey, it includes the hamlets of Claverhambury, Fishers Green, Holyfield, Sewardstone and Upshire, and the village of High Beach. The local council is Waltham Abbey Town Council.

History
Waltham Holy Cross was an ancient parish in the Waltham hundred of Essex.  
The Abbey of Waltham held the manor of Waltham until the dissolution of the monasteries, when it passed to the Denny family.

The parish adopted the Public Health Act 1848 in 1850 which created the Waltham Holy Cross local government district and a local board of health. In 1894 this district became Waltham Holy Cross Urban District, governed by an urban district council. The parish ceased to have any role in local government, aside from election of the board of guardians. After 1930 as a designated urban parish it had only nominal existence.

The parish was within the Metropolitan Police District and part of the review area of the Royal Commission on Local Government in Greater London; however, it did not form part of the proposed Greater London area, because it was entirely within the Metropolitan Green Belt and had limited connection to the London built-up area.

On 1 April 1974 the Waltham Holy Cross Urban District was abolished and combined with other local government districts to form the Epping Forest District. The urban district council was replaced with Epping Forest District Council. A limited number of former boroughs and urban districts were permitted to retain limited local government powers as successor parishes. Waltham Holy Cross civil parish gained a parish council and became used for local government again. The parish was initially known as Waltham Holy Cross, but by resolution of the new parish council it was renamed Waltham Abbey and the status of a town was adopted, with the parish council becoming Waltham Abbey Town Council.

The Enfield Island Village area was transferred from the parish, to the unparished area of Enfield in Greater London in 1994. The parish ceased to be part of the Metropolitan Police District in 2000 and came within the area of Essex Police that year.

Government
The local council is Waltham Abbey Town Council. The town hall is located on Highbridge Street in the town of Waltham Abbey. There are eleven councillors elected from five wards. The wards are High Beech (2 councillors), Honey Lane (3 councillors), North East (2 councillors), Paternoster (2 councillors), and South West (2 councillors).

Geography
The M25 motorway runs through the parish east–west, splitting it into two approximately equal parts. The town of Waltham Abbey is located immediately to the north of the motorway. The northwest of the parish contains part of the Lee Valley Park. Most of the parish, and the majority of its population, are within the Waltham Abbey post town of the EN postcode area. However, lightly populated parts to the south are within the Loughton post town of the IG postcode area, and the Sewardstone and Gilwell Park areas to the southwest are within the E postcode area of the London post town.

The main settlement in the parish is the town of Waltham Abbey, and the other smaller settlements are the hamlets of Claverhambury, Fishers Green, Holyfield, High Beach, Sewardstone and Upshire.

Claverhambury consists of approximately 15 homes and farms by two woods, Deerpark Wood and Stockings Grove, to the north-east of the town centre.  Its bounds are the eastern slopes of Galley Hill. The western side of this hilltop is wooded. It is directly south of Epping Long Green, a tall ridge topped by the Stort Valley Way footpath between the towns of Epping and Harlow.

Holyfield Lake is home to the Fishers Green Sailing Club, offering a beautiful setting with tiny islands dotting the 180-acre tree-lined lake, making sailing all the more challenging and interesting.

Holyfield consists of approximately 11 homes and farms and is mostly on the western slopes of Monkham's Hill, near the top of which is situated Monkham's Hall. Seven buildings in the hamlet are architecturally listed. In the west are plant nurseries above lakes of the River Lea, and an arboretum and tree nursery separate the hamlet from the town to the south.  It is located at grid reference .

Transport
There are no railway lines or stations within the parish, although there are several located nearby. The nearest stations are Chingford, half a mile south of the parish boundary; Loughton, one mile to the east; and Waltham Cross, half a mile to the west.

Arms

References

Civil parishes in Essex
Epping Forest District
Waltham Abbey